Lacys Creek is a  long 2nd order tributary to the Rocky River in Chatham County, North Carolina.  This is the only stream of this name in the United States.

Course
Lacys Creek rises about 1.5 miles northwest of Siler City, North Carolina in Chatham County.  Lacys Creek then flows northeast to join the Rocky River about 2 miles north of Siler City.

Watershed
Lacys Creek drains  of area, receives about 48.0 in/year of precipitation, has a wetness index of 443.07 and is about 58% forested.

References

Rivers of North Carolina
Rivers of Chatham County, North Carolina